Jim Shepard (born 1956) is an American novelist and short story writer, who teaches creative writing and film at Williams College.

Biography

Shepard was born in Bridgeport, Connecticut. He received a B.A. at Trinity College in 1978 and an MFA from Brown University in 1980. He currently teaches creative writing and film at Williams College. His wife, Karen Shepard, is also a novelist. They are on the editorial board of the literary magazine The Common, based at Amherst College.

Writing

Shepard's work has been published in McSweeney's, Granta, The Atlantic Monthly, Esquire, Harper's, The New Yorker, The Paris Review, Ploughshares, Triquarterly, and Playboy.  His short story collection — Like You'd Understand, Anyway — won the Story Prize in 2007, and was nominated for a National Book Award in 2007. The novel Project X won the 2005 Massachusetts Book Award. Along with writing novels and short stories, Shepard has also drafted two screenplays, one about Kenneth Donaldson and the O'Connor v. Donaldson case, and the other a movie adaptation of Project X.

Several features characterize Shepard's writings, including a tendency to finish his stories with what Charles Baxter called an "in medias res ending", or an ending in the middle of the plot's events; a thematic focus on what Shepard calls the "costs of certain kinds of ethical passivity"; and a preference for events-driven plots that fight against what Shepard terms "the tyranny of the epiphany", referencing the more psychological, less active plots popularized by short story writers such as James Joyce. Additionally, Shepard writes from the point of view of characters of a wide variety of nationalities.

Shepard's stories often rely on substantial historical research based on real events. His 2007 collection Like You'd Understand Anyway includes stories about the Greek playwright Aeschylus, the Chernobyl disaster and the 1964 Alaska earthquake. The collection acknowledges over sixty non-fiction works that helped to shape the historical detail in the stories. Similarly, Shepard's 2011 collection You Think That's Bad also cites an extensive bibliography, including Avalanches and Snow Safety, The Japanese Earthquake of 1923, Climate Changes and Dutch Water Management, and Satanism and Witchcraft. His 2015 novel The Book of Aron involved extensive research into the Holocaust, which he called "critically important".

Non c'è ritorno (66thand2nd; 2012) is a previously unpublished collection of Jim Shepard's short stories for the Italian market.

Shepard is the winner of the Rea Award for the Short Story for 2016.

Shepard adapted his short story The World to Come, along with novelist Ron Hansen, into a screenplay for the 2020 film of the same name, directed by Mona Fastvold.

Bibliography
Novels
 Flights (1983), 
 Paper Doll (1987), 
 Lights Out in the Reptile House (1990), 
 Kiss of the Wolf (1994), 
 Nosferatu (1998), 
 Project X (2004), 
 The Book of Aron (2015)
 Phase Six (2021)

Story collections
 Batting against Castro (1996)
 Love and Hydrogen (2004)
 Like You'd Understand, Anyway (2007)
 You Think That's Bad (2011)
 The World to Come (March 2017)

Miscellaneous
 Editor, with Ron Hansen of You've Got to Read This: Contemporary American Writers Introduce Stories that Held Them in Awe (1994)
 Editor, with Amy Hempel of Unleashed: Poems by Writers' Dogs (1995)
 Editor, Writers at the Movies: Twenty-six Contemporary Authors Celebrate Twenty-six Memorable Movies

References

1956 births
Living people
Trinity College (Connecticut) alumni
American short story writers
Williams College faculty
Brown University alumni
Writers from Bridgeport, Connecticut
O. Henry Award winners